Events from the year 1999 in South Korea.

Incumbents
President: Kim Dae-jung
Prime Minister: Kim Jong-pil

Events

 30 January–6 February – The Asian Winter Games take place in Gangwon Province.
 9–15 June: First Battle of Yeonpyeong
 June 30: Sealand Youth Training Center Fire
 November 27: the first Mnet Asian Music Awards
 December 1:NTN Entertainment founded, as predecessor name was Hangame Communication.
 December 22: Korean Air 8509

Full date unknown
 Korea Human Rights Foundation is established.

Sports

 1999 World Fencing Championships
 1999 Asian Winter Games
 1999 K League
 1999 Korean FA Cup

Births

 February 11 – Dino, member of boy group Seventeen
 March 5 – Yeri, member of girl group Red Velvet
 April 21 – Choi Hyun-suk, co-leader of Treasure
 April 23 – Chaeyoung, member of girl group Twice
 May 5 – Lee Na-eun, member of girl group April
 May 29 — Park Ji-hoon, member of boy group Wanna One
 July 19 - Kim So-hye, singer and actress, member of I.O.I
 August 3 - Yoo Yeon-jung, singer, member of I.O.I and WJSN
 September 29 – Choi Ye-na, soloist
 October 20 - Chuu, singer, member of girl group Loona
 November 2 — Park Woo-jin, member of boy group Wanna One
 November 12 - Choi Yoo-jung, singer, member of I.O.I and Weki Meki
 December 4 - Kang Mi-na, singer and actress, member of I.O.I and Gugudan
 December 4 - Kim Do-yeon, singer and actress, member of I.O.I and Weki Meki

See also
1999 in South Korean music
List of South Korean films of 1999
Years in Japan
Years in North Korea

References

 
South Korea
Years of the 20th century in South Korea
1990s in South Korea
South Korea